The 2011 Status Athens Open was a professional tennis tournament played on hard courts. It was the fourth edition of the tournament which is part of the 2011 ATP Challenger Tour. It took place in Athens, Greece between 11 and 17 April 2011.

ATP entrants

Seeds

 Rankings are as of April 4, 2011.

Other entrants
The following players received wildcards into the singles main draw:
  Konstantinos Economidis
  Manolis Glezos
  Alex Jakupovic
  Charalampos Kapogiannis

The following players received entry from the qualifying draw:
  Teodor-Dacian Craciun
  Treat Conrad Huey
  Roko Karanušić
  Andrey Kumantsov

Champions

Singles

 Matthias Bachinger def.  Dmitry Tursunov, walkover

Doubles

 Colin Fleming /  Scott Lipsky def.  Matthias Bachinger /  Benjamin Becker, walkover

External links
Official Website
ITF Search
ATP official site
About-us

Status Athens Open
Hard court tennis tournaments
2011 in Greek tennis
Status Athens Open